Babak Razi (born June 2, 1981) is an Iranian footballer who plays for Pas Hamedan in the Azadegan League.

Club career
In 2008, Razi Joined Zob Ahan F.C. after spending the previous season at Shirin Faraz F.C.

Club career statistics
Last Update  1 June 2010 

 Assist Goals

References

1981 births
Living people
Shamoushak Noshahr players
Shirin Faraz Kermanshah players
Zob Ahan Esfahan F.C. players
Iranian footballers
Association football midfielders